No Money Needed is a 1932 German comedy film directed by Carl Boese and starring Hedy Lamarr, Heinz Rühmann, and Hans Moser. It was shot at the Babelsberg Studios in Berlin with sets designed by the art director Julius von Borsody. It premiered on 5 February 1932. It was based on a play by Ferdinand Alternkirch and was shot during November 1931. 
A French remake (Pas besoin d'argent) and an Italian remake (Non c'è bisogno di denaro) were made in 1933. Boese himself remade the story in 1953 under the title The Uncle from America.

Synopsis
A virtually bankrupt businessman in a small town manages to convince people that his newly arrived cousin, who is equally impoverished, is a millionaire.

Cast
Hedy Lamarr as Käthe Brandt
Heinz Rühmann as Heinz Schmidt
Hans Moser as Thomas Theodor Hoffmann
Ida Wüst as Frau Brandt
Hans Junkermann as Herrmann Brandt
Kurt Gerron as Bank President Binder
Paul Henckels as The Mayor
Hans Hermann Schaufuß as Hotelier
Albert Florath as head of savings banks
Fritz Odemar as Schröder
Gerhard Dammann as husband
Hugo Fischer-Köppe
Ludwig Stössel
Siegfried Berisch
Wolfgang von Schwindt
Heinrich Schroth
Karl Hannemann
Leopold von Ledebur

References

External links

Films of the Weimar Republic
1932 comedy films
German comedy films
Films directed by Carl Boese
German films based on plays
Films produced by Arnold Pressburger
German black-and-white films
Bavaria Film films
Cine-Allianz films
1930s German-language films
Films shot at Babelsberg Studios
1930s German films